The Orbital Sciences X-34 was intended to be a low-cost testbed for demonstrating "key technologies" that could be integrated into the Reusable Launch Vehicle program. It was intended to be an autonomous pilotless craft powered by a "Fastrac" liquid-propellant rocket engine, capable of reaching Mach 8 and performing 25 test flights per year. 

The X-34 began as a program for a suborbital reusable-rocket technology demonstrator. In early 2001, the first flight vehicle was near completion, but the program was ended due to budget concerns. Up to this point, the project had encompassed spending of just under $112 million: $85.7M from the original contract with designer Orbital Sciences, $16M from NASA and various government agencies for testing, and an additional $10M for Orbital Sciences to adapt its L-1011 carrier to accommodate the X-34. The program was officially canceled by NASA on March 31, 2001. The unpowered prototype had been used only for towing and captive flight tests when the project was canceled.

The two demonstrators remained in storage at Edwards Air Force Base until they were temporarily moved to Mojave, California, in late 2010. This prompted some speculation that they might be restored to flight status. As of April 2020, one of the fuselages was seen lying in parts in a scrapyard in nearby Rosamond, California.

Gallery

See also
 List of experimental aircraft
 Cygnus (spacecraft)
 Lockheed Martin X-33
 Prometheus (spacecraft) (CCdev)
 Sierra Nevada Dream Chaser (CCdev)

References

External links
 
 NASA Dryden X-34 Technology Testbed Demonstrator Photo Collection
 Federation of American Scientists

Edwards Air Force Base
Spaceplanes
X-34, Orbital Sciences